The Adamstown Church, or alternatively Adamstown Adventist Church, is a religious building affiliated with the Seventh-day Adventist Church, located in the town of Adamstown in the Pitcairn Islands, a dependent territory of the United Kingdom in Oceania, at an isolated end of the Pacific Ocean.

The building is located on the main street called "The Square". The church is unique in the entire island of Pitcairn (the only inhabited island of the archipelago) and is the product of a mission sent by Adventists who converted almost all of the small number of inhabitants of the island to that Protestant denomination.

See also
Seventh-day Adventist Church
History of the Pitcairn Islands

References

Churches in the Pitcairn Islands
Adamstown, Pitcairn Islands
Seventh-day Adventist churches